The Songosongo Islands is an Archipelago in Kilwa District of Lindi Region in Tanzania's Indian ocean coast.The archipelago is composed of 21 coral reefs including the 4 coral islands. The four Islands in the archipelago are Fanjove, Nyuni Island, Songo Songo and Okuza Island. The Islands have been found to contain 20 million tonnes worth of natural gas within the archipelago.

References

 Islands of Lindi Region
 Islands of Tanzania